Luther Cullen Carter (February 25, 1805 – January 3, 1875) was a U.S. Representative from New York.

Carter was born in Bethel in Massachusetts' District of Maine on February 25, 1805, the son of Dr. Timothy Carter and Frances "Fanny" (Freeland) Carter.  He was educated in Maine, and a business and mercantile career in Saco.  At age 20, he moved to New York City, where he continued his business career and served as president of the Market Savings Bank.

In addition to his business career, Carter served as a member of the Board of Education of New York City for several years beginning in 1853.  He later moved to Long Island City, where he lived in semi-retirement as a gentleman farmer.

Carter was elected as a Republican to the Thirty-sixth Congress (March 4, 1859 – March 3, 1861).  He served as chairman of the Committee on the District of Columbia (Thirty-sixth Congress).  He was an unsuccessful candidate for reelection in 1860 to the Thirty-seventh Congress.

Death and burial
He died in New York City January 3, 1875.  He was interred in Brooklyn's Green-Wood Cemetery, Section 113, Lot 18623.

Family
On September 29, 1829, Carter married Mary L. Converse (d. 1882) of Palmer, Massachusetts.

Carter's siblings included Timothy J. Carter, who also served in Congress.

References

1805 births
1875 deaths
People from Bethel, Maine
Burials at Green-Wood Cemetery
Republican Party members of the United States House of Representatives from New York (state)
19th-century American politicians
People from Long Island City, Queens